Bansidhar Mishra (Nepali/Maithili:वंशीधर मिश्र) is a Nepali politician of CPN (Unified Socialist). He is also a member of the standing committee of the party. He was a member of the House of Representatives from Rautahat-4 and Rautahat-3.

Mishra has been the Nepalese Ambassador to Bangladesh.

Electoral history

2017 legislative elections

1999 legislative elections

1994 legislative elections

1991 legislative elections

See also
 CPN (Unified Socialist)
 Ram Chandra Jha
 
 Satrudhan Mahato
Pramod Kumar Yadav

References 

People from Rautahat District
Nepal MPs 1999–2002
Nepal MPs 1991–1994
Nepalese Hindus
Communist Party of Nepal (Unified Socialist) politicians
Year of birth missing (living people)
Living people
Members of the 2nd Nepalese Constituent Assembly